Behaviour Interactive Inc. is a Canadian video game development studio specializing in the production of 2D and 3D action/adventure games for home video game consoles, handheld game consoles, PCs and mobile. Based in Montreal, Canada, the company is the producer and publisher of the action-horror game, Dead by Daylight.

History 
The company was founded in 1992 in Quebec City as Megatoon. Two years later, the company’s current CEO and Executive Producer, Rémi Racine, co-founded the Montreal-based Multimedia Interactive (MMI) to develop interactive entertainment software for CD-ROM. Both companies were sold to Malofilm Communications in 1996, and a year later, they were merged into Behaviour Interactive with Racine as General Manager. In 1997, the studio released Jersey Devil on PlayStation and later Windows. The 3D platformer was the first console game made entirely in Quebec. Distributed by Sony, Jersey Devil caught the eye of Infogrames Entertainment, which approached Behaviour to produce what would become Bugs Bunny: Lost in Time, released in 1999.

Artificial Mind & Movement era
In 1999, Racine and some investors bought the studio back, but they had to rename it, changing the name in 2000 to Artificial Mind & Movement Inc. (A2M). As A2M, the studio continued its work-for-hire projects, producing titles for clients including Konami, Sony Computer Entertainment, Ubisoft, Disney Interactive Studios, Nintendo, EA and Activision. In November 2008, the company acquired Santiago-based Wanako Games from Activision Blizzard, which was the first and largest South American game studio. As A2M, the studio maintained its focus on producing original titles, releasing Scaler (2004), WET (2009) and Naughty Bear (2010). This last title had more than 800,000 console-unit sales and laid the groundwork for the studio's 2016 breakthrough original game, Dead by Daylight.

2nd Behaviour Interactive era
On November 8, 2010, Artificial Mind & Movement announced its name was returning to Behaviour Interactive. The change was partly due to increased production of original titles and thus stronger presence in the gaming community, partly due to the availability of the original name, and partly due to one particular obscene interpretation of the initialism "A2M". 

The studio has maintained its work-for-hire services with major clients while continuing to invest in original games. In 2016, Behaviour released Dead by Daylight, a multiplayer survival action horror game published by Sweden's Starbreeze. Dead by Daylight sold more than 1 million copies in its first two months and now has more than 50 million players worldwide. In 2018, Behaviour purchased the game’s publishing rights from Starbreeze for USD $16 million. Thanks in large part to the game’s success, Behaviour has seen its revenues grow from CAD $25 million in 2015 to CAD $225 million in 2021. 

In April 2022, Behaviour announced the opening of a new office in Toronto. The studio said the office will accommodate at least 50 employees working on projects across Behaviour’s three business units.  

In May 2022, it was announced Behaviour Interactive had acquired the Seattle-based game development studio Midwinter Entertainment.

Behaviour's next major original release, Meet Your Maker, is due for release in April 2023 on PC, PlayStation 4/5, and Xbox One, Series X/S. The game is billed as a "post-apocalyptic first-person building-and-raiding game where every level is designed by players for players."

In the summer of 2022, Behaviour released Hooked on You, a dating sim spinoff from the Dead by Daylight franchise, and the melee brawler Flippin Misfits. Both games were revealed alongside Meet Your Maker at the first-ever Behaviour Beyond showcase of new and upcoming releases broadcast in August 2022.

In February 2023, it was announced that Behaviour had acquired UK-based video game developer SockMonkey Studios, which is now renamed Behaviour UK - North.

In March 2023, it was announced that a film based on Dead by Daylight is in development, with Blumhouse Productions, Atomic Monster Productions and Striker Entertainment co-producing.

Business units 
Behaviour's operations are divided into three business units – Studios, Digital and Business Solutions. Its Studios unit provides work-for-hire development services to major video game and entertainment industry brands such as Disney, Sony, Activision, Warner Bros., Ubisoft, HBO and Nintendo. Its Digital unit produces Behaviour's original content including Dead by Daylight. Behaviour's Business Solutions unit applies game technology to business ends for corporate clients such as Bombardier, CAE and CN Rail.

Abolition of crunch time 
Behaviour Interactive made headlines as one of the first video game studios to abolish crunch time, a controversial yet widespread practice in the video game industry that requires employees to work longer hours, often unpaid, to meet project milestones. The policy helped Behaviour earn its designation as one of Canada's Best Workplaces by gamesindustry.biz in 2018 and again in 2021 and 2022.

Titles

as Artificial Mind & Movement

as Behaviour Interactive

Bethesda infringement lawsuit 
On June 21, 2018, Bethesda Softworks sued Warner Bros. Interactive Entertainment and Behaviour Interactive over Westworld, a mobile game based on the science fiction television series Westworld, alleging that the game is a "blatant rip-off" of Fallout Shelter, another mobile game, co-developed by Behaviour.

In a suit filed in a United States District Court for the District of Maryland, Bethesda alleges that Westworld "has the same or highly similar game design, art style, animations, features and other gameplay elements" as Fallout Shelter. Bethesda sued for copyright infringement, breach of contract and misappropriating trade secrets, seeking a jury trial and damages. The lawsuit also alleged that Westworld identically reproduced some software bugs that were originally present in Fallout Shelter. The lawsuit was settled in January 2019 on friendly terms.

References

External links 
 

Companies based in Montreal
Canadian companies established in 1992
Video game companies established in 1992
1992 establishments in Quebec
Video game companies of Canada
Video game development companies
Privately held companies of Canada